Union is the name of some places in the U.S. state of Wisconsin:
Union, Burnett County, Wisconsin, a town
Union, Door County, Wisconsin, a town
Union, Eau Claire County, Wisconsin, a town
Union (community), Eau Claire County, Wisconsin, an unincorporated community
Union, Grant County, Wisconsin, an unincorporated community
Union, Pierce County, Wisconsin, a town
Union, Rock County, Wisconsin, a town
Union (community), Rock County, Wisconsin, an unincorporated community
Union, Vernon County, Wisconsin, a town
Union, Waupaca County, Wisconsin, a town